The Chutak Hydroelectric Plant is a run-of-the-river power project on the Suru River (a tributary of Indus) in Kargil district in the Indian union territory of Ladakh ( from the capital Leh). The barrage of the project is at Sarze village and the powerhouse is located on the right bank of the Suru near Chutak village. The project construction began on  23 September 2006, and the first three generators were commissioned in November 2012. The fourth was commissioned in January 2013.

The project includes construction of a  barrage, having 15 m height above the crest level, an underground powerhouse, and 3.3 m dia and 10.02 km long head race tunnel and installation of four nos. of vertical Francis turbine of 11 MW each.
Each 11 MW underground generating unit will operate under a rated head of 52 m and a rated discharge of 24.05 cubic metres per second. The barrage diverts water from the river and involves a flooding of only . Thus the power density is 44 MW per 0.135 km2, i.e. very high 326 W/m2, compared to dam-based hydroelectric projects. The project will be connected to the Northern Grid by the 220 kV Leh-Srinagar transmission line, which is to be scheduled for commissioning along with project’s commissioning.

The project is being developed by M/s National Hydroelectric Power Corporation Ltd. The generating equipment is being supplied, erected and commissioned by M/s Bharat Heavy Electricals Limited. The generator/turbine was manufactured by BHEL's Bhopal unit whereas the controls were supplied by BHEL's Bangalore unit. The erection and commissioning is being done by BHEL's Power Sector. As of date all four generating units of this project are running successfully.

References

Dams completed in 2014
Energy infrastructure completed in 2014
Dams in Ladakh
Run-of-the-river power stations
Dams in the Indus River basin
Power stations in Ladakh
Buildings and structures in Ladakh
2012 establishments in Jammu and Kashmir